Tum Saray (born 10 July 1992) is a Cambodian footballer who plays for Electricite du Cambodge in the Cambodian League and the Cambodia national team.

References

External links

1992 births
Living people
Cambodian footballers
Cambodia international footballers
Association football midfielders
Preah Khan Reach Svay Rieng FC players
Nagaworld FC players